Sabu Dastagir (possibly born Selar Sabu; 27 January 1924 – 2 December 1963) was an Indian actor who later gained United States citizenship. Throughout his career he was credited under the name Sabu and is primarily known for his work in films during the 1930s–1940s in Britain and the United States.  He was inducted into the Hollywood Walk of Fame in 1960.

Early life
Born in 1924 in Karapur, Mysore, Kingdom of Mysore, then a Princely State of British India, Sabu was the son of an Indian mahout (elephant rider). While most reference books list his full name as "Sabu Dastagir" (which was the name he used legally), research by journalist Philip Leibfried suggests that his full name was in fact Selar Sabu.

Career

When he was 13, Sabu was discovered by documentary filmmaker Robert Flaherty, who cast him in the role of an elephant driver in the 1937 British film Elephant Boy. This was adapted from "Toomai of the Elephants", a story by Rudyard Kipling.  In 1938 producer Alexander Korda commissioned A. E. W. Mason to write The Drum as a starring vehicle for the young actor. Sabu is perhaps best known for his role as Abu in the 1940 fantasy adventure film The Thief of Bagdad. Director Michael Powell said that Sabu had a "wonderful grace" about him. In 1942, Sabu played another role based on a Kipling story, namely Mowgli in Rudyard Kipling's Jungle Book directed by Zoltan Korda, which was shot entirely in California. He starred alongside Maria Montez and Jon Hall in three films for Universal Pictures: Arabian Nights (1942), White Savage (1943) and Cobra Woman (1944).

After becoming an American citizen in 1944, Sabu joined the United States Army Air Forces and served as a tail gunner and ball-turret gunner on B-24 Liberators. He flew several dozen missions with the 370th Bombardment Squadron of the 307th Bomb Group in the Pacific, and was awarded the Distinguished Flying Cross for his valor and bravery. His career declined after World War II as he was unable to secure equivalent roles in Hollywood that British films had offered. He occasionally did gain significant parts, such as his supporting role in the British film Black Narcissus (1947). Through most of the 1950s he starred in largely unsuccessful European films. In 1952, he starred in the Harringay Circus with an elephant act.

He was considered for the role of Birju in Mehboob Khan's 1957 film Mother India which would have marked his debut in Hindi films but he was denied a work permit and the role ended up going to Sunil Dutt. Sabu never got to appear in a film made in his native country. In 1963, he made a comeback to Hollywood with a supporting role in Rampage opposite Robert Mitchum. He played another supporting role alongside Brian Keith in the Disney film A Tiger Walks. This would turn out to be his final role as he died three months before the film was released.

Personal life 
On 19 October 1948, Sabu married little-known actress Marilyn Cooper (whose only film part, as Princess Tara in Song of India in 1949, was not credited), with whom he had two children. Their marriage lasted until his death. Their son Paul Sabu established the rock band Sabu in the 1980s. Their daughter Jasmine Sabu was an animal trainer for the motion picture industry. She died in 2001.

Sabu was the subject of a paternity suit. A dancer with whom he had appeared in Black Narcissus, Brenda Marian Julier, alleged that he was the father of her daughter Michaela, born in 1948. At the time of the trial, in October 1950, Julier had married Frank Ernst. The jury found in favor of Sabu by a vote of 9 to 3. However, in March 1952, an appeals court reversed the verdict and ordered a new trial. It found that the trial judge's jury instructions were erroneous and prejudicial, and that Sabu's attorney had effectively put Julier on trial. The day the 2nd trial was scheduled to begin, in July 1953, Sabu settled the case without admitting paternity. He agreed to defray Julier's costs, set up a trust fund, and pay monthly support until the child reached 21. At that time, Ernst stated his intent to adopt the girl.

In November 1950, a fire destroyed the 2nd storey of his Los Angeles home. Arthur E. Wall and Andre Perez were arrested for arson shortly afterward; Perez pleaded guilty in July 1951. He revealed that he was asked to set the fire by Wall, Sabu's friend, who told him the actor needed the insurance money. Sabu's insurer, Northwestern Mutual, had originally paid out his claim, but sued him in November 1952 after learning about the arson.

Sabu's brother, Shaik Dastagir (whose name Leibfried suggests was the source of confusion surrounding Sabu's full name), managed his career.  In 1960, his brother Shaik was shot dead at his home during a botched robbery. The perpetrator, 18-year-old Jimmy E. Shields, was a former employee at the brothers' furniture store. He was convicted of involuntary manslaughter and sentenced to 1 to 10 years in prison.

Death
On 2 December 1963, Sabu died suddenly in Chatsworth, California, of a heart attack, a month before his 40th birthday. He is interred at the Forest Lawn – Hollywood Hills Cemetery. His wife said in a television interview that two days before his death, during a routine medical check, his doctor told him: "If all my patients were as healthy as you, I would be out of a job".

Filmography

References

Bibliography
 Leibfried, Philip. Star of India: The Life and Films of Sabu. Oklahoma; BearManor Media, 2010.
 Holmstrom, John. The Moving Picture Boy: An International Encyclopaedia from 1895 to 1995, Norwich, Michael Russell, 1996, p. 125-126.
 Dye, David. Child and Youth Actors: Filmography of Their Entire Careers, 1914-1985. Jefferson, NC: McFarland & Co., 1988, p. 207-208.

External links

 
 
 
 
 
 
 
 Sabu at Virtual History
 Powell and Pressburger Pages article
 Criterion Collection Essay
 

1924 births
1963 deaths
Indian emigrants to the United States
Indian male film actors
American male film actors
United States Army Air Forces personnel of World War II
American male actors of Indian descent
People with acquired American citizenship
British male film actors
British Muslims
American Muslims
Burials at Forest Lawn Memorial Park (Hollywood Hills)
Male actors from Mysore
Recipients of the Distinguished Flying Cross (United States)
Indian male child actors
United States Army Air Forces soldiers
20th-century British male actors
20th-century American male actors